Nasirshahr  is a city in the Central District of Robat Karim County, Tehran province, Iran. At the 2006 census, its population was 23,802 in 5,764 households, when it was in Golestan District. On March 12, 2011, when Golestan District was separated from the county to establish Baharestan County, the city was transferred from the district to the Central District of Robat Karim County. The following census in 2011 counted 26,935 people in 7,121 households. The latest census in 2016 showed a population of 28,644 people in 8,602 households.

References 

Robat Karim County

Cities in Tehran Province

Populated places in Tehran Province

Populated places in Robat Karim County